Brancato is a surname. It may refer to:
 Al Brancato (1919–2012), American baseball player
 Anthony Brancato (1914–1951), American criminal
 Chris Brancato (born 1962), American screenwriter and producer
 George Brancato (1931–2019), American football player and coach
 Jasper Brancato, American politician
 John Brancato, American screenwriter
 Lillo Brancato (born 1976), American actor

Italian-language surnames

The name is believed to originate from a word from the Sicilian dialect of Italian meaning white poplar, also known as abele; a vastly inordinate number of the bearers of this surname are specifically of Sicilian origin, as reported by Joseph Fucilla in his 1949 book Our Italian Surnames.